E. J. Ejiya (born October 6, 1995) is an American football linebacker who is currently a free agent. He played college football at North Texas.

Professional career

Baltimore Ravens
Ejiya was signed by the Baltimore Ravens as an undrafted free agent on April 28, 2019. During preseason, he played in four games. He had a total of 3 tackles, 1 sack, and 1 quarterback hit. He was waived during final roster cuts on August 31, 2019,

TSL Aviators
On May 15, 2021, Ejiya signed with the TSL Aviators.

Pittsburgh Maulers
Ejiya was selected in the 21st round of the 2022 USFL Draft by the Pittsburgh Maulers. He was placed on injured reserve on May 20, 2022.

References

Further reading

Living people
American football linebackers
People from Blaine, Minnesota
North Texas Mean Green football players
Baltimore Ravens players
The Spring League players
Pittsburgh Maulers (2022) players
1995 births